The following is a list of Michigan State Historic Sites in Monroe County, Michigan. Sites marked with a dagger (†) are also listed on the National Register of Historic Places in Monroe County, Michigan.


Current listings

See also
 National Register of Historic Places listings in Monroe County, Michigan

Sources
 Historic Sites Online – Monroe County. Michigan State Housing Developmental Authority. Accessed May 18, 2011.

References

Monroe County
 
Tourist attractions in Monroe County, Michigan
State Historic Sites